Rodrigo Sebastián Arciero (born 12 March 1993) is an Argentine professional footballer who plays as a defender for Finnish club Inter Turku.

Career
Arciero began with youth spells in Boca Juniors and CAI. In 2014, Arciero joined Argentine Primera División side All Boys on loan. His professional debut arrived on 17 April versus Arsenal de Sarandí, which preceded him scoring his opening goal during a 4–2 defeat to Newell's Old Boys on 10 May. 2013–14 ended with relegation to Primera B Nacional. Arciero remained for two seasons in tier two, making forty-seven appearances in the process. In January 2016, Arciero was signed by newly-promoted Primera B Nacional team Talleres. However, after just two appearances in all competitions he departed in July 2016.

On 21 July 2016, fellow Primera B Nacional club Independiente Rivadavia signed Arciero. Thirty-seven appearances followed throughout the 2016–17 campaign. In July 2017, Arciero joined Patronato of the Argentine Primera División. His debut for the club came on 9 September versus Argentinos Juniors. A move to Banfield was completed on 20 July 2018. After twenty-seven appearances across three seasons, including two in the Copa Sudamericana versus Defensa y Justicia, Arciero left for Finland in January 2021 after completing a transfer to Veikkausliiga side SJK for an undisclosed fee.

On 23 January 2022, he signed a contract with Inter Turku for the 2022 and 2023 seasons, with an option for 2024.

Career statistics
.

Honours
Talleres
Primera B Nacional: 2016

References

External links

1993 births
Living people
People from Ushuaia
Argentine footballers
Association football defenders
Comisión de Actividades Infantiles footballers
All Boys footballers
Talleres de Córdoba footballers
Independiente Rivadavia footballers
Club Atlético Patronato footballers
Club Atlético Banfield footballers
Seinäjoen Jalkapallokerho players
FC Inter Turku players
Torneo Argentino A players
Torneo Federal A players
Argentine Primera División players
Primera Nacional players
Veikkausliiga players
Argentine expatriate footballers
Expatriate footballers in Finland
Argentine expatriate sportspeople in Finland